Deebo Bhattacharya (1930-1994) was a Pakistani-Bangladeshi music director. The following is a list of films he scored:

filmography

References

Sources
 

Discographies of Bangladeshi artists
Discographies of Pakistani artists